This is a list of Time Team episodes from series 11.

Episode

Series 11

Episode # refers to the air date order. The Time Team Specials are aired in between regular episodes, but are omitted from this list. Regular contributors on Time Team include Tony Robinson (presenter); archaeologists Mick Aston, Phil Harding, Carenza Lewis, Helen Geake, Brigid Gallagher, Neil Holbrook, Faye Simpson, Matt Williams, Ian Powlesland, Kerry Ely; Guy de la Bedoyere (historian); Jackie McKinley (bone specialist); Victor Ambrus (illustrator), Stewart Ainsworth (landscape investigator), John Gater (geophysicist); Henry Chapman (surveyor); Paul Blinkhorn, Mark Corney (pottery).

See also
 Time Team Digs
 Time Team Extra
 Time Team Specials
 Time Team Others

References

External links
Time Team at Channel4.com
The Unofficial Time Team site Fan site

Time Team (Series 11)
2004 British television seasons